The 2015 Kyrgyzstan First League is the 24th season of Kyrgyzstan League, the Football Federation of Kyrgyz Republic's top division of association football. Alay Osh are the defending champions, having won the previous season. The season will start on 21 March 2014.

League tables
Zone A

Zone B

2015 in Kyrgyzstani football